Gaguda is a village located in the Sojat Mandal, Pali District, in the Indian state of Rajasthan.

Location 

Gaguda is 30.6 km distance from its District Main City Pali, and 250 km distance from its State Main City Jaipur.

Atbra, Bagari Nagar, Billawas, Boyal, Chadwas and Chandawal Nagar are other villages in the Sojat Mandal.

Demographics 

It has a population of about 1764 living in around 345 households.

Education

Schools 

 Govt Senior Secondary School, gaguda
Sarswati public school Gaguda
 Krishna public Schools Gaguda
 GSECS Chadwass
 GGSSECS Sojat city

Colleges 

 CLG Institute of Engineering & Technology in Sumerpur; dist. Pali
 Govt. Sec. School in Banta near by Hospital Marwar Junction.
 Adarsh Girls College in Nawab ka Bera; Tank; Ajmer.

Transport

Rail 

 Bomadra- 26 km
 Rajkiawas- 28 km
 Bhesana- 28 km
 Sojat Road- 28 km

Air 

 Jodhpur Airport- 64 km
 Dabok Airport- 174 km
 Sanganeer Airport- 274 km
 Jaisalmer Airport- 315 km

References 

Villages in Pali district